The Works of Art Committee is a select committee of the House of Lords with a remit to administer the House of Lords Works of Art Collection Fund and to consider matters relating to works of art in the House of Lords, within the strategic and financial framework established by the House Committee.

Membership
As of 16 May 2012, the members of the committee are as follows:

 The Lord Luke (Chairman)
 The Lord Crathorne
 The Baroness Gale
 The Lord Harries of Pentregarth
 The Baroness Howells of St Davids
 The Baroness Maddock
 The Lord Myners
 The Baroness Rendell of Babergh
 The Lord Roberts of Llandudno
 The Earl of Shrewsbury
 The Lord Stevenson of Coddenham
 The Baroness Valentine

See also
Parliamentary committees of the United Kingdom

Committees of the House of Lords
British art